Khanrud (also Romanized as Khānrūd; also known as Eslām Rūd) is a village in Torqabeh Rural District, Torqabeh District, Torqabeh and Shandiz County, Razavi Khorasan Province, Iran. At the 2006 census, its population was 374, in 122 families.

References 

Populated places in Torqabeh and Shandiz County